Chelativorans intermedius is a Gram-negative, non-spore-forming and rod-shaped bacteria from the genus of Chelativorans which has been isolated from water from a coastal hot spring on the Green Island on Taiwan.

References

Phyllobacteriaceae
Bacteria described in 2015